U9 (S188) is a retired Type 205 submarine of the German Navy. She was laid down on 10 December 1964 by Howaldtswerke of Kiel. U9 was launched on 20 October 1966 and commissioned on 11 April 1967. She was decommissioned on 3 June 1993, and is now a museum ship at Technikmuseum Speyer in Speyer.

References 
 

Type 205 submarines of the German Navy
Ships built in Kiel
1966 ships
Cold War submarines of Germany
Museum ships in Germany
Speyer